, is a 2011 Japanese science fiction anime television series produced by Sunrise under the direction of Yoshimitsu Ohashi. Script supervisor is Shin Yoshida with mechanical designs by Ippei Gyōbu. The series began broadcasting in Japan starting July 3, 2011 on the Mainichi Broadcasting System and later will be rebroadcast by TV Kanagawa, TV Aichi, Tokyo MX, and Teletama. The anime was originally licensed by Bandai Entertainment for streaming, but they shut down in 2012. Following the 2012 closure of Bandai Entertainment, Sunrise announced at Otakon 2013, that Sentai Filmworks has rescued Sacred Seven, along with a handful of other former BEI titles.

Plot
Alma Tandōji lives a lonely and solitary life in a certain port city within the Kantō region. One day, he is approached by Aiba Ruri who asks for his help, for the power of the Sacred Seven which resides within Alma. However, Alma turns her away. In the past, Alma had hurt people with that power. Since that moment, he had foresworn it. But when the peaceful city is attacked by a monster, Alma reluctantly decides to use the Sacred Seven. However, his powers go berserk and the situation becomes even more dire. At that moment, Ruri comes to his aid by inserting a sacred stone made using her jewel necklace and transform him to his true form.

Characters

The main protagonist of Sacred Seven. He was born with the power of Sacred Seven from his mother's exposure. A few years ago before the series, he lost control of his powers and harmed a lot of people. Therefore, he has been living in solitude ever since. Alma can only control his true powers if Ruri inserts a special Lightstone in him. He has access to all seven powers (hence the name 'Sacred Seven'). It has also been stated that he has the highest level of Sacred Seven that even surpasses Kijima. Alma used to have a crystal that belonged to his mother that was supposed to suppress his powers, but it was thrown into the river by a bully which caused the incident. He has been looking for it ever since, hence developed a habit of looking for rocks. He became a member of the Geology Club at the same time Kagami and Ruri did. In episode 11, it was revealed that Kenmi caused the incident to test Alma's powers. Also the revelation that he met Ruri when he was little and realizes how important she is to him.

The main heroine of Sacred Seven. She is the daughter of a billionaire noble family who were killed by a Darkstone. She created Aiba Foundation to combat against the Darkstones. She is a Lightstone that has the ability to turn a gem into a Lightstone and insert it into Alma to control his true powers. She became the chairman of Alma's school (where she heavily renovated the school) and a member of the Geology Club to keep in contact with Alma. She has a twin sister named Aoi who also survived the Darkstone aftermath, but was crystallized. Her whole foundation is occupied with female maids. She has feelings for Alma which is shown throughout the series.

Ruri's sister, she had protected herself with a Crystal like stone when Kenmi killed her parents, since then she had been sleeping inside this crystal. It seems she has feelings for Kagami. In episode 12 she is shown her waking up and alive.

Ruri's personal butler and field commander for the Aiba Foundation. At 18, he graduated from Harvard and is enrolled in Alma's school for his convenience. He became class president and a member of the Geology Club when he enrolled. He has his own personal mech to fight Darkstones called the Engagement Suit.

A childhood friend of Alma after the incident. She is the only person that is not afraid of Alma despite the rumors. She's the head of the Geology Club. She has an obsession of finding good rocks, a trait that she passed on to Alma.
Naito Kijima

He is the main rival and sub-antagonist of Alma. He is the same being as Alma except that he overuses his power, causing his condition to deteriorate unless it is treated with a vaccine. He can alter objects around his surroundings and Darkstones into his weapons. He truly wants to be free even if he has to fight the Aiba Foundation for it. He has a bitter grudge against his former superior, Kenmi. He considers Alma as a higher class than himself. His companion, Fei, takes care of him.
Fei Lau Zui

Another lightstone like Ruri who escaped with Kijima from Kenmi.  12 years old. He uses his blood to create vaccines for Kijima due to the overuse of his powers. He had a brother named Zero who lost control of himself, until he and Kijima saved his sanity. However, his brother was killed by Kenmi shortly after, causing Fei to go on a rampage. Due to a lack of explicitly gendered pronouns when others refer to him, with his gender only identified through the official Twitter, fansubs mislabeled him as a girl.
Doctor Kenmi

The main antagonist of the series. He is a scientist for a private organization, Kenmi Group, that researches the capabilities of Sacred Seven. He was the one that experimented on Naito and was his former superior. He created a way to utilize the Sacred Seven power with an artificial crystal. However, its powers are limited to a certain extent. After Alma and Ruri's confrontation with Naito, it is revealed that he's performing illegal experiments on humans with the Seven's powers in secret. In episode 11, it was revealed that he caused the incident with Alma. With Zero's lightstone, he was able to become stronger. His armor is called Cyclops.
Arakune (also known as SP)

Kenmi's personal secretary and possesses an artificial crystal to transform into an armor called Rabbit. She has a tendency to complain due to her lackadaisical nature and behaves in a manner akin to a child, however she is a very skilled operative. This is demonstrated aptly in her encounters with Naito, who she has fought to standstill on two separate occasions.
Hung Lau

Fei's older brother and another Darkstone victim of Kenmi. He was the one responsible for the death of Ruri's parents and Kagami Sr. Kenmi altered body with armor and try to control his mind, which was unsuccessful at points, and turned him in to the Darkstone monster Zero, an armored fiery melting Balrog of ash. In episode 11, Fei cured him, only to be killed by Kenmi.

Other Darkstones

The Darkstones are creatures that base their bodies based on various mythological figures. In episode 10 it is revealed that they were formed from hearts sacrificed to the Aztec god Quetzalcoatl.
Perseus: Appears in episode 1. Powers include a hooked sword, stone lasers from the Medusa head for the left hand, super speed, and a torso mouth.
Medusa: Appears in episode 1. Powers include high jumping, a scorpion tail, head lasers, and snake tentacles.
Orochi: Appears in episode 2. Powers include wind manipulation, flight, and six dragon tentacles that launch cyclones and fire balls from the mouths.
Centipedes: Appear in episodes 2 and 3. Powers include flight, sharp teeth, burrowing, and self destruction.
Basilisk: Appears in episode 4. Powers include stone touch conversion, speed, and dividing.
Balor: Appears in episode 4. Powers include levitation, body spikes and self destruction.
Tsuchigumo: Appears in episode 5. Powers include summoning fast lice, earth manipulation, and eight jaws.
Zero: Appears in episodes 6, 7, and 11. Powers include speed, a high body temperature, flames from the head, and a whip tail.
Fujin: Appears in episode 9. Powers include speed, foot oriented martial arts, and high jumping.
Raijin: Appears in episode 9. Powers include a whip tongue, absorbing mouth, mouth flames and lasers, and a mouth in each foot.
Pyramid: Appears in episode 12. Powers include levitation, body lasers, and gravity manipulation.
Kappa: Appears in the movie. Its only known power is water manipulation.

Media

CDs
The music for Sacred Seven is composed by Toshihiko Sahashi. An original studio album, was released July 20, 2011. The album was released on October 5, 2011, Flying Dog will release the soundtrack for the series titled Sacred Seven Original Soundtrack. The soundtrack includes the TV version of the opening and ending theme song, as well as insert songs and background music. A drama character album was released on September 7, 2011, titled Fragment of S7 Alma Tandouji × Ruri Aiba, which features songs sung by Alma Tandouji (Takuma Terashima) and Ruri Aiba (Megumi Nakajima) and a short audio drama. On October 5, another drama character album will be released featuring Makoto Kagami (Miyu Irino) and Aiba Maid Tai S7.

The anime's opening theme song, "stone cold", was performed by FictionJunction. It reached number 16 on the Oricon charts.

Episode list

References

External links
 
 

2011 Japanese television series debuts
2011 Japanese television series endings
Anime series
Anime with original screenplays
Action anime and manga
Bandai Entertainment anime titles
Bandai Namco franchises
Kodansha manga
School life in anime and manga
Sentai Filmworks
Shōnen manga
Sunrise (company)
Television shows set in Yokosuka, Kanagawa